Coby is a given name and surname.

Coby may also refer to:

 Coby (musician) (born 1985), a Serbian rapper
 Coby (One Piece), a character from the manga and anime series
 Coby Electronics Corporation, an American manufacturer of consumer electronics
 Coby Hall, an historic residence in Florence, Alabama, U.S.
 Coby (film), from the 2017 Cannes Film Festival

See also

Cobe (disambiguation)
Cobie, a Dutch feminine given name
Cobi (disambiguation)
Kobe (disambiguation)
Kobi (disambiguation)